Fernando Manuel Antunes Mendes (born 5 November 1966) is a Portuguese former footballer who played as a left back.

Club career
Mendes was born in Setúbal. Having been brought up at Sporting CP's youth system at the same time as Paulo Futre, he made his first-team debut in 1984–85 aged 18, and reached the Portugal national team shortly after. In the following seasons he started regularly for the Lions, but they only won one trophy.

In 1989, Mendes joined Sporting's rivals S.L. Benfica, being sparingly used over three years – in between, he spent one season at Boavista F.C. – winning the Taça de Portugal in his last one, where he teamed up with Futre. Released by Benfica, he appeared for three teams in as many years before joining the last of the Big Three, FC Porto, thus representing all the major clubs in his country as Futre.

Mendes won his first Primeira Liga championship with the northern side in 1996–97 (the second overall), contributing 22 matches and three goals to the feat. In the following two campaigns, which ended in the same fashion, he was also regularly played.

Aged nearly 33, Mendes left for another spell at Belenenses, then joined hometown's Vitória F.C. for his first season in the second division, which ended in promotion. After helping the Sadinos to retain their league status, he retired from professional football with top-division totals of 321 games and 12 goals.

International career
Mendes earned 11 full caps in one decade, but did not attend any major international tournament.

Honours
Sporting
Supertaça Cândido de Oliveira: 1987

Benfica
Primeira Liga: 1990–91
Taça de Portugal: 1992–93
Supertaça Cândido de Oliveira: 1989, 1992

Boavista
Taça de Portugal: 1991–92

Porto
Primeira Liga: 1996–97, 1997–98, 1998–99
Taça de Portugal: 1997–98
Supertaça Cândido de Oliveira: 1996, 1998; Runner-up 1997

References

External links

1966 births
Living people
Sportspeople from Setúbal
Portuguese footballers
Association football defenders
Primeira Liga players
Liga Portugal 2 players
Sporting CP footballers
S.L. Benfica footballers
Boavista F.C. players
C.F. Estrela da Amadora players
C.F. Os Belenenses players
FC Porto players
Vitória F.C. players
C.D. Montijo players
Clube Olímpico do Montijo players
Portugal youth international footballers
Portugal under-21 international footballers
Portugal international footballers